Kinabalu may refer to any of several Malaysian geographical names:

Kota Kinabalu, the capital of the Malaysian state of Sabah.
Mount Kinabalu, the highest peak in Malaysia.
Kinabalu National Park, the state park home to Mount Kinabalu.